The Rolls-Royce Exe, or Boreas, was a 24-cylinder air-cooled X block sleeve valve aircraft engine intended primarily for the new Fairey Fleet Air Arm aircraft, particularly the Fairey Barracuda. This is notable given the relatively small  displacement, the Merlin requiring  for approximately the same power level. The X-24 layout made this quite a compact engine.

The Exe was named after the River Exe, although Rolls-Royce later transferred the use of river names to its gas turbine engines.

Design and development
The Exe was under development in 1939, having been started in the 1930s, along with the Peregrine and Vulture. Work on the Exe was suspended in August 1939, and stopped about August 1940. Ernest Hives, head of the Rolls-Royce aero engine division, wanted to stop work on the Exe, Peregrine, and Vulture to concentrate on the Merlin and Griffon engines. An enlarged version, the Rolls-Royce Pennine, was built later in the war, but cancelled as jet engines became the company's focus.

Originally intended for the Supermarine Type 322 and Fairey Barracuda the Exe was only test flown in a Fairey Battle, the first flight taking place on 30 November 1938. This aircraft continued in use for some time as a communications aircraft where the Exe was noted to be quite reliable in service.

Applications 
 Fairey Barracuda (intended)
 Fairey Battle (testbed)
 Supermarine Type 322 (intended)

Specifications (Exe)

See also

References

Notes

Bibliography
 Gunston, Bill. World Encyclopaedia of Aero Engines. Cambridge, England. Patrick Stephens Limited, 1989. 
 Lloyd, Ian Rolls-Royce: The Merlin at War (1978, Macmillan London) 
 Lumsden, Alec. British Piston Engines and their Aircraft. Marlborough, Wiltshire: Airlife Publishing, 2003. .
 Pugh, Peter.The Magic of a Name: The Rolls-Royce Story, The first 40 Years (2000, Icon Books Cambridge) 
 Rubbra, A.A. Rolls-Royce Piston Aero Engines - a designer remembers: Historical Series no 16 :Rolls-Royce Heritage Trust, 1990.

External links
 Photo of the Rolls-Royce Exe
 The Exe-engined Fairey Battle (top picture) in a 1948 issue of Flight

Exe
1930s aircraft piston engines
X engines